Marie-Gaïané Mikaelian was the defending champion from 2002, but she chose not to compete in 2003.

Virginia Ruano Pascual won the title in two sets over Saori Obata.

Draw

Seeds

  Petra Mandula (second round)
  Emmanuelle Gagliardi (semifinals)
  Saori Obata (final)
  Virginia Ruano Pascual (winner)
  Flavia Pennetta (second round)
  Jill Craybas (quarterfinals)
  Angelique Widjaja (second round)
  Jelena Kostanić (quarterfinals)

Finals

Top half

Bottom half

References

Singles
2003 WTA Tour
2003 in Uzbekistani sport